Ghostbird is the second album from singer Zee Avi. The album's first single "The Book of Morris Johnson" was released on iTunes on 28 June 2011.

Track listing

Chart performance

References

2011 albums
Zee Avi albums